The 2020 United States Senate election in New Jersey was held on November 3, 2020, to elect a member of the United States Senate to represent the State of New Jersey. It was held concurrently with the 2020 United States presidential election, as well as various other elections. The primary elections were moved from June 2, 2020, to July 7, 2020, due to COVID-19 pandemic concerns.

Incumbent Cory Booker, a member of the Democratic Party and a former 2020 presidential candidate, won a second full term against the Republican nominee, Rik Mehta. Booker narrowly won Morris County, which no Democratic Senator had carried since 1984, when Senator Bill Bradley swept every county. With 2,541,239 votes, Booker also made history as the highest vote earner in a statewide non-presidential election in New Jersey history.

Democratic primary

Candidates

Nominee
 Cory Booker, incumbent U.S. Senator and former candidate for President of the United States in 2020

Eliminated in primary
 Lawrence "Larry" Hamm, chairman of the People's Organization for Progress

Withdrew
 Lisa McCormick, activist and candidate for Senate in 2018 (Running for Congress in New Jersey's 12th congressional district)
 Harsh Naik

Declined
 Josh Gottheimer, incumbent U.S. Representative for New Jersey's 5th congressional district (running for re-election)
 Donald Norcross, incumbent U.S. Representative for New Jersey's 1st congressional district (running for re-election)

Endorsements

Results

Republican primary

Candidates

Nominee
Rikin "Rik" Mehta, pharmaceutical executive and attorney

Eliminated in primary
Eugene Anagnos, retired teacher
Tricia Flanagan, healthcare policy expert, biotech consultant, Independent candidate for U.S. Senate in 2018
Natalie Lynn Rivera, activist, Independent candidate for U.S. Senate in 2018
Hirsh Singh, engineer, candidate for Governor of New Jersey in 2017, and candidate for New Jersey's 2nd congressional district in 2018

Withdrawn
Navodaya Garepalli
Stuart Meissner, former New York Assistant Attorney General and Manhattan Assistant District Attorney, SEC Whistleblower Attorney, and Independent candidate for U.S. Senate in 2013
Gary Rich, former Monmouth County freeholder

Declined
Matt Rooney, attorney and political pundit

Endorsements

Results

Other candidates

Green Party

Nominee 
 Madelyn R. Hoffman, peace activist, 2018 U.S. Senate candidate, 1997 Green Party gubernatorial candidate, and 1996 Green Party Candidate for Vice President

Endorsements

LaRouche was Right

Nominee
 Daniel Burke

Of, By, For!

Nominee
 Veronica Fernandez

Independents

Declared 
 Luis Vergara (as a write-in candidate)

General election

Predictions

Endorsements

Polling

with Hirsh Singh

on whether or not respondents would vote to reelect Cory Booker

Results 

The election was not close, with Booker winning re-election by 16.31%. Key to Booker's landslide victory was heavily populated areas such as Hackensack, Newark, and Trenton. Mehta did well in Ocean County, which is a Republican stronghold, as well as many rural areas of the state. Booker received 2,541,239 votes. Booker was sworn in for a second term on January 3, 2021. His term will expire on January 3, 2027.

Counties that swung from Republican to Democratic
Morris (largest municipality: Parsippany)
Somerset (largest municipality: Franklin Township)

By congressional district
Booker won 9 out of the 12 congressional districts in New Jersey, and Mehta won the other 3, including one that elected a Democrat.

See also
 2020 New Jersey elections

Notes

References
General

Specific
 
 
  (State affiliate of the U.S. League of Women Voters)

External links
Official campaign websites
 Cory Booker (D) for Senate
 Daniel Burke (LR) for Senate 
 Veronica Fernandez (OBF) for Senate
 Madelyn R. Hoffman (G) for Senate 
 Rik Mehta (R) for Senate

2020
New Jersey
United States Senate
Cory Booker